Guangzhou Tram (or "YoungTram") is the tram system in Guangzhou, Guangdong province, China. It is operated by Guangzhou Tram Corporation, a wholly owned subsidiary of Guangzhou Metro Corporation.

Lines 
As of September 2021, 2 lines (Haizhu Tram and Huangpu Tram Line 1) are in operation, 1 line (Huangpu Tram Line 2) in Huangpu District is under construction, and several lines in Huangpu District, Zengcheng District, Guangzhou South Railway Station, Guangzhou Baiyun Airport and other places are being planned.

Haizhu 

The first trial section of the Haizhu Island Circular New Tram (or THZ1) opened on 31 December 2014.

Huangpu 

According to a document released by Huangpu District Government in 2017, 13 tram lines are planned in the area.

Construction of Huangpu's first tram line, Huangpu Tram Line 1, started in March 2018. It operates between Xiangxue and Xinfeng Lu, connecting central Huangpu and Changlingju area. Trail operation without passengers started in September 2019. The initial section opened on 1 July 2020, and the remaining section opened on 28 December 2020.

In addition to line 1, Huangpu Tram Line 2 started construction in December 2019 and is expected to be opened in 2023. It operates between Xiangxue and Nangang, mainly serves residents of Xiangxue, Yunpu and Dongqu.

See also 
 Guangzhou Metro
 Zhujiang New Town APM

References

External links 
 

Transport in Guangzhou
Railway lines opened in 2014
2014 establishments in China